Antidisestablishmentarianism is a position that advocates that a state Church (the "established church") should continue to receive government patronage, rather than be disestablished.

In 19th century Britain, it developed as a political movement in opposition to disestablishmentarianism, the Liberal Party's efforts to disestablish or remove the Church of England as the official state church of England, Ireland, and Wales. The Church's status has been maintained in England, but in Ireland, the Anglican Church of Ireland was disestablished in 1871. In Wales, four Church of England dioceses were disestablished in 1920 and became the Church in Wales. In colonial America, the Church of England was disestablished in six colonies despite its mild popularity in Anglicanism in the 1780s and many former Anglicans deemed themselves Episcopalians instead.

Antidisestablishmentarianism is also frequently noted as one of the longest non-scientific words in the English language.

History
The matter of disestablishment of the Church of England is an ongoing issue, often tied with the position of the Monarchy of the United Kingdom as "Supreme Governor" of the Church (see Act of Settlement 1701).

British philosopher Phillip Blond, an advocate of the antidisestablishmentarian position, argues that England having a state church has prevented the country from embracing any sort of ethnic or racial nationalism. Blond has stated that official patronage of the Church of England has allowed the country to withstand and speak against totalitarian ideologies of the 20th century that were plaguing other parts of the world. He further opined that "Just as we need the church to protect the political, so we need it to protect the idea of civil society." Blond concludes that the "church establishment in England creates a more diverse political and social life, prevents religious extremism and helps to minimise partisan conflict and secular violence." Giles Coren, a British writer, supports antidisestablishmentarianism because it allows all English people to receive meaningful rites such as marriage.

In April 2014, Nick Clegg, then Deputy Prime Minister of the United Kingdom and Leader of the Liberal Democrats, said that he thought the Church of England and the British state should be separated "in the long run". David Cameron, the Prime Minister of the United Kingdom at the time, responded to Clegg's comments by stating that the position was "a long-term Liberal idea, but it is not a Conservative one", adding that he believed the existence of an established church is beneficial.

Word length

The word antidisestablishmentarianism, with 28 letters and 12 syllables (an-ti-dis-es-tab-lish-ment-ar-i-an-is-m), is one of the longest words in the English language. It is estimated to be the 6th largest word in the English dictionary. However, the word is not recorded in Merriam Webster's dictionary of American English.

See also

 Accommodationism
 Christian amendment
 Christian nationalism
 Christian state
 Constitutional references to God
 Floccinaucinihilipilification
 History of Christian flags
 Honorificabilitudinitatibus
 Longest word in English
 Longest words
 National church
 Pneumonoultramicroscopicsilicovolcanoconiosis
 Pseudopseudohypoparathyroidism
 Separation of church and state
 Supercalifragilisticexpialidocious
 Theonomy

Citations

General and cited references

 Adrian Hastings, Church and State: the English Experience (Exeter: University of Exeter Press, 1991.)

External links

English words
Long words
Political theories
Religion in the United Kingdom